Kilgore High School is a public high school located in the city of Kilgore, Texas, in Gregg County, United States and classified as a 4A school by the UIL. It is a part of the Kilgore Independent School District located in southwest Gregg County. In 2019, the school was given an Accountability Rating of 'C' by the Texas Education Agency, and identified for additional targeted state support.

Athletics
The Kilgore Bulldogs compete in the following sports:

Baseball (Boys)
Basketball (Boys & Girls)
Cross Country (Boys & Girls)
Football (Boys)
Golf (Boys & Girls)
Soccer (Boys & Girls)
Softball (Girls)
Tennis (Boys & Girls)
Track & Field (Boys & Girls)
Volleyball (Girls)

The football and soccer teams play their home games at R.E. St. John Memorial Stadium, sharing the facility with the Kilgore College football team.

Athletic titles
Football
2004 - 4A Division 1 State Champion
2013 - 3A Division 1 State Runner-Up
Baseball
2018 4A Regional Finalist
2019 4A State Semi-Finalist
Boys Track
1974 - 2A State Champion
Boys Soccer
2018 - 4A-16 Conference Champion. Lost in third round of playoffs.
2017 - 4A State Champion
2016 - 4A Region 2 Champion and State Semi-Finalist. Lost to eventual 4A state champion Palestine in a 3-2 shootout.
2015 - 4A Region 2 Champion and State Semi-Finalist. Lost to eventual 4A state champion San Elizario.
2014 - 4A-32 Conference Champion. Lost in third round of playoffs.
2013 - 4A Region 2 Runner-Up
2012 - 4A Region 2 Runner-Up
2011 - 4A State Finalist. Lost to Boerne Champion in state championship match.

Fine arts
Kilgore's high school band won the UIL Sweepstakes award in the 2011-2012 school year, and scored highly in the Area C marching contest in 2012.

Notable alumni
 Bobby Cross (Class of 1948) — Former NFL and CFL professional football player
 Larry Hickman (Class of 1954) — Former NFL and CFL professional football player
 Buddy Humphrey (Class of 1954) — Former NFL professional football player
 Eddie Jones (Class of 2006) — Former NFL professional football player

  [[ Max Reinbach, III (Class Favorite, Most Handsome)

Notable faculty

John Heffner. Young Earth Creationist and many-time co-host to Carl Baugh television program Creation in the 21st Century who currently teaches Pre-calculus at Kilgore and chairs its math department. He has risen to notoriety recently as some popular skeptics have criticized his understanding of mathematical application to the real world as lacking, flawed, and overly cavalier, in particular his use of the Malthusian growth model, which he uses to teach creationism to his audience.

References

External links
Kilgore High School website
Kilgore ISD website

Public high schools in Texas
Schools in Gregg County, Texas